Doberman or Dobermann most commonly refers to Dobermann, a breed of dog.

It may also refer to:

Doberman (album), a 2003 album by Tomoyasu Hotei
Doberman (band), a Japanese ska/punk band
"The Doberman", a song by Kasabian on their album Empire
Dobermann (film), a 1997 French film starring Vincent Cassel
Dobermann (surname)
Doberman-Yppan, a North American music publisher
Doberman Detective, a manga series and its feature film adaptation
Duane Doberman, a character from The Phil Silvers Show